WAMT (1190 AM) is an American radio station airing a Christian radio format. Licensed to Pine Castle–Sky Lake, Florida, United States, it serves the Orlando area. The station is an owned and operated affiliate of Family Radio. From 2018 to 2022 it was owned and operated by Relevant Radio and had a Catholic teaching format.

WAMT switched to Spanish-language sports at the beginning of 2010. Previously, it featured programming from the CBS Radio Network, Fox News Radio, and Westwood One.

At January 21, 2010, at 11:37 pm local time, its website address redirected all visitors to the website of then-sister station, WHOO, which carried a sports format. In December 2011, ESPN Deportes Radio signed off from the station, and the station stunted for about a month, playing canned music and replays of old speeches.

Genesis Communications announced that it would sell WAMT and WHOO to Relevant Radio. The sale was completed August 14, 2018. In late 2018-early 2019, both WAMT and WHOO switched from their former formats to Catholic talk, branded as “Relevant Radio”.

In 2021, Relevant Radio swapped WAMT to Family Radio's parent company, Family Stations, in exchange for WBMD in Baltimore, Maryland. The swap, which left WHOO as Relevant Radio's only Orlando station, allowed that network to enter Baltimore (where Family also owned WFSI) and Family Radio to enter the Orlando market.

References

External links

AMT
Radio stations established in 1959
1959 establishments in Florida
Family Radio stations
Christian radio stations in Florida